The 2011 Skate America was the first event of six in the 2011–12 ISU Grand Prix of Figure Skating, a senior-level international invitational competition series. It was held at the Citizens Business Bank Arena in Ontario, California on October 21–23. Medals were awarded in the disciplines of men's singles, ladies' singles, pair skating, and ice dancing. Skaters earned points toward qualifying for the 2011–12 Grand Prix Final.

Eligibility
Skaters who reached the age of 14 by July 1, 2011 were eligible to compete on the senior Grand Prix circuit.

In July 2011, minimum score requirements were added to the Grand Prix series and were set at two-thirds of the top scores at the 2011 World Championships. Prior to competing in a Grand Prix event, skaters were required to earn the following:

Entries
The entries were as follows.

Schedule
 All times are Pacific Standard Time (GMT -08:00).
 Friday, October 21
 7:05 p.m. – Men's short program
 8:45 p.m. – Short dance
 Saturday, October 22
 11:39 a.m. – Men's free skating
 1:34 p.m. – Free dance
 7:00 p.m. – Pairs' short program
 8:25 p.m. - Ladies' short program
 Sunday, October 23
 1:05 p.m. - Pairs' free skating
 2:45 p.m. - Ladies' free skating
 7:00 p.m. - Exhibitions (Skating Spectacular)

Results

Men
Michal Březina took an eight-point lead in the short program. He was concerned by the narrowness of the rink: "I was kind of scared if I will fit with the curve because the rink is not so wide. I almost hit the board in practice when I was going for the triple flip." He was third in the free skating but held on to win his first Grand Prix title. Kevin van der Perren placed fourth in the short program and won the free skating to take silver medal, his first GP medal since 2007 Skate Canada International. It was the third Grand Prix silver medal of his career. The 2009 Skate America champion, Takahiko Kozuka, took the bronze medal. This was the first time that no US skater stood on the men's podium at Skate America.

Ladies
Alissa Czisny won the short program, while Carolina Kostner placed first in the free skating. Czisny edged out Kostner by only 0.13 points for the gold medal. Viktoria Helgesson took the bronze and became the first Swedish skater to win a Grand Prix medal.

Pairs
In the short program, Savchenko and Szolkowy attempted the rare throw triple Axel for the first time in their career but experienced a hard fall. They were given credit for completing the revolutions and finished in 5th place, 3.4 points off the lead. They rebounded to place first in the free skating and won their second consecutive Skate America title and third in their career. They added a reverse lasso lift to their free skating but performed only a double twist because they were still working on a new entry to the triple. Dan Zhang and Hao Zhang took silver, their fifth medal at Skate America, after missing the previous season due to hand, shoulder and knee injuries. Kirsten Moore-Towers and Dylan Moscovitch won the bronze, their second medal at the event.

Ice dancing
Davis and White repeated as Skate America champions, with Pechalat and Bourzat winning the silver medal, and Tobias and Stagniunas pulling up from fifth to take bronze, their first Grand Prix medal. Bourzat was recovering from bronchitis.

References

External links

 
 2011 Hilton HHonors Skate America at U.S. Figure Skating
 ISU GP Skate America 2011: Entries, time and practice schedule at the International Skating Union

Skate America, 2011
Skate America